Ariefusus rutilus is a species of sea snail, a marine gastropod mollusc in the family Fasciolariidae, the spindle snails, the tulip snails and their allies.

Description

Distribution

References

 Nicolay K. & Berthelot G. (1996). A new Fusinus from western Africa (Gastropoda: Fasciolariinae). La Conchiglia. 28(178): 25-28
 Vermeij G.J. & Snyder M.A. (2018). Proposed genus-level classification of large species of Fusininae (Gastropoda, Fasciolariidae). Basteria. 82(4-6): 57-82.

rutilus
Gastropods described in 1996